Dracula lotax is a species of orchid.

lotax